Sajanella is a monotypic genus of flowering plants belonging to the family Apiaceae. Its only species is Sajanella monstrosa, native from Central Asia to Siberia and Mongolia.

References

Apioideae
Monotypic Apioideae genera